Freeman Rexer (1918-1964) was a professional American football player who played wide receiver for the Chicago Cardinals, Boston Yanks, and Detroit Lions.

References

1918 births
American football wide receivers
Boston Yanks players
Chicago Cardinals players
Detroit Lions players
Tulane Green Wave football players
1964 deaths